Roadhouse Grill was an American chain of casual dining steakhouses in the eastern part of the United States founded in 1992. After filing for bankruptcy protection in late 2007, all twenty remaining locations were closed the week of May 12, 2008, as the company was forced into liquidation.

In 2009, three former employees of the Tonawanda, New York location near Buffalo, New York, reopened the restaurant under the name Buffalo Roadhouse Grill, offering similar fare plus local specialties such as beef on weck and Buffalo wings.

Independently owned international venues of the chain following the same name and concept continue to operate in Italy, Bulgaria and Brazil.

References

Steakhouses in the United States
Defunct restaurant chains in the United States
Defunct companies based in Florida
Restaurants established in 1992
Restaurants disestablished in 2008
Companies that filed for Chapter 11 bankruptcy in 2007